The Crash may refer to:

 The Crash (band), a pop-rock band from Turku, Finland
 The Crash (1928 film), an American drama film directed by Edward F. Cline
 The Crash (1932 film), an American drama film directed by William Dieterle
 The Crash (2017 film), an American thriller film directed by Aram Rappaport
 "The Crash" (Life on Mars), a title sometimes used about the first episode of Life on Mars
 "The Crash" (Mad Men), an episode of Mad Men
 The Crash (professional wrestling), a Mexican professional wrestling promotion

See also
Crash (disambiguation)